A gun mantlet  is an armour plate or shield attached to an armoured fighting vehicle's gun, protecting the opening through which the weapon's barrel projects from the hull or turret armour and, in many cases, ensuring the vulnerable warhead of a loaded shell does not protrude past the vehicle's armour. On many tanks during World War II, the gun mantlet covered both the main gun and any coaxial armament, and had the thickest armour on the vehicle. However, in many late Cold War and post-Cold War tank designs, the gun mantlet became one of the weaker parts of a vehicle's turret armour and thus a weakness. 

This was because as many mantlet designs were attached directly to the gun, it drastically increased the weight of the whole gun system and the amount of effort needed to elevate and depress it. This was an issue for gun stabilizers as they proved to be less efficient and accurate in keeping the gun steady with the added weight of the mantlet. Therefore, as seen in tanks such as the M1 Abrams and the Leopard 2, the mantlet had less armour than the rest of the turret to cut down on weight and they became far smaller to minimise the area that a projectile could hit for if it did, it would very likely result in a penetration and disable the gun and damage the fighting compartment. 

On vehicles such as the Chieftain, the mantlet is dispensed with completely.

Gallery

See also
 Gun shield
 Mantlet

References

Vehicle armour